Gemma Font Oliveras (born 23 October 1999) is a Spanish professional footballer who plays as a goalkeeper for Liga F club FC Barcelona.

Personal life
Gemma Font is the older sister of Meritxell Font, who plays as a goalkeeper for Barcelona B.

Club career
Font started her career in Barcelona's academy in 2013. In June 2020, following the 2019–20 season in which she played 14 games for Barcelona B in the Segunda División, Font renewed her contract with Barcelona until 2022. She had spent the season alternating between training with the first team and starting as goalkeeper for the B team. On 20 January 2021, she made her debut for Barcelona in a Primera División game against Rayo Vallecano. She entered the field as a substitute for Sandra Paños at half-time in a 7–0 victory for Barcelona.

On 6 June 2022, she signed a contract extension with Barcelona till 2024.

International career
Font was called up for Spain U–23 in 2021.

Career statistics

Club

Honours
Barcelona
 UEFA Women's Champions League: 2020–21
 Primera División: 2019–20, 2020–21, 2021–22
 Copa de la Reina: 2019–20, 2020–21, 2021–22
 Supercopa de España Femenina: 2019–20, 2021–22
 Copa Catalunya: 2018, 2019

References

External links
 Gemma Font at FC Barcelona
 
 

1999 births
Living people
Women's association football goalkeepers
Spanish women's footballers
FC Barcelona Femení players
Footballers from Barcelona
Primera División (women) players
Segunda Federación (women) players
FC Barcelona Femení B players
Sportswomen from Catalonia
21st-century Spanish women